Rolf Bergersen (15 July 1906 – 29 April 1966) was a Norwegian  sport shooter, World Champion and Olympic competitor.

Bergersen became World Champion in running target in 1937, and again in 1949. He competed at the 1952 Summer Olympics in Helsinki, achieving a fourth place, and at the 1956 Summer Olympics in Melbourne, with a 6th placement.

References

External links

1906 births
1966 deaths
Norwegian male sport shooters
ISSF rifle shooters
Olympic shooters of Norway
Shooters at the 1952 Summer Olympics
Shooters at the 1956 Summer Olympics
People from Trøgstad
Sportspeople from Viken (county)
20th-century Norwegian people